Alan Combe (born 3 April 1974) is a Scottish football coach and former player who is goalkeeping coach for Dundee. He played as a goalkeeper for Cowdenbeath, St Mirren, Dundee United, Bradford City and Kilmarnock. He has previously worked as a goalkeeping coach for Alloa Athletic, Heart of Midlothian, Hibernian and Cove Rangers.

Club career
Combe was born in Edinburgh. He was Kilmarnock's regular goalkeeper until he suffered a serious hip injury early in the 2009–10 season. He was released by Kilmarnock on 31 January 2011.

Combe joined Alloa Athletic in August 2011 as a goalkeeping coach. In November 2011, Combe played for Clyde against Annan Athletic and kept a clean sheet. He went on trial with Hamilton Academical in December 2011, making his debut on 27 December 2011.

In March 2012, Combe signed a deal with Greenock Morton that was due to run until the end of the 2012–13 season. He left Morton in September 2012 to Join Hearts, primarily as a goalkeeping coach. Combe retained his playing registration during spells with Hearts and Hibernian, but did not appear in a first team match for either club.

International career
Combe was named in the senior Scotland squad on a few occasions but was not capped. Combe did however appear for the Scotland B team in 2005, playing in the second half of a 2–0 victory against Poland B.

Coaching career
While playing for Morton, Combe worked as a goalkeeping coach at Alloa Athletic. Combe was released from his contract with Morton in 2012 to become a goalkeeping coach at Hearts, although he retained his playing registration in case of emergency. After being released by Hearts in 2014, in July Combe joined boyhood club Hibernian as a player-coach. He left Hibernian during the 2020 close season. Combe joined Cove Rangers as a goalkeeping coach in September 2020. In July 2021, Combe was announced as the new goalkeeping coach for Dundee, following the departure of Bobby Geddes.

Personal life
Combe is the great nephew of Bobby Combe, who played for Hibs and Scotland in the 1940s and 1950s.

Career statistics

Notes

References

External links

See also
Greenock Morton F.C. season 2011–12 | 2012–13

1974 births
Living people
Footballers from Edinburgh
Association football goalkeepers
Scottish footballers
Scotland B international footballers
Cowdenbeath F.C. players
St Mirren F.C. players
Dundee United F.C. players
Bradford City A.F.C. players
Kilmarnock F.C. players
Clyde F.C. players
Hamilton Academical F.C. players
Scottish Football League players
Scottish Premier League players
English Football League players
Greenock Morton F.C. players
Heart of Midlothian F.C. non-playing staff
Heart of Midlothian F.C. players
Hibernian F.C. non-playing staff
Hibernian F.C. players
Dundee F.C. non-playing staff